Railway electrification in New Zealand consists of three separate electric systems, all in the North Island. Electrification was initially adopted by the New Zealand Railways for long tunnels; the Otira Tunnel, the Lyttelton Rail Tunnel and the two Tawa Tunnels of the Tawa Flat Deviation. Electrification of Wellington suburban services started with the Johnsonville Line and Kapiti Line out of Wellington from the 1930s. Auckland suburban services were electrified in 2014–2015. Electrification of long-distance services on the North Island Main Trunk (NIMT) dates from 1986. New long tunnels, for example the Rimutaka Tunnel and the Kaimai Tunnel, were operated by diesels, and the Otira and Lyttelton Tunnels have converted to diesel operation.

From 1908 to 1953, there was an electrified mine railway from the Stockton mine on the West Coast of the South Island.

The use of 16 kV 16.7 Hz AC for the NIMT was proposed in 1950.

History

Stockton mine railway 
The Stockton mine railway was, in 1908, New Zealand's first electric railway. It carried coal from the Westport-Stockton Coal Companies mine to the NZR railhead at Ngakawau on the West Coast of the South Island from 1908 to 1953, when it was replaced by an aerial cableway. The line was 10.5 km long, with 2.4 km in two long tunnels. The system used 275 V DC from a low overhead line via trolley poles, and 915 mm gauge track. The seven locos were of low built "mine" type.

Otira and Lyttelton Tunnels 

The first NZR line to be electrified in New Zealand was the Otira Tunnel in 1923. This long tunnel (8.55 km) with a steep gradient (1 in 33) could not have been worked by steam. In 1916, there was consideration of electrification of the entire 100 km section with steep grades from  Jackson (West Coast) to Springfield (Canterbury), but in 1923, just the Otira-Arthur's Pass section (14 km) was electrified.

In 1929, the Lyttelton Line through the Lyttelton Rail Tunnel was electrified.  This tunnel (opened in 1867) was short and had a lesser gradient than Otira (0.3%) but replacement of steam operation was desirable. Electrification of this and other lines was being studied by the Public Works Department as early as 1911.

The Merz & McLellan Report 
The 1925 report by the English consulting firm of Merz & McLellan was commissioned by the Minister of Railways Gordon Coates to investigate electrification of suburban services in the four main centres of Auckland, Wellington, Christchurch and Dunedin. For Christchurch it recommended electrification of the Lyttelton Line but not the main lines north and south. Now only Auckland and Wellington have suburban passenger services. The firm's partner Charles Merz of Newcastle upon Tyne had reported on Melbourne suburban electrification in 1908 and 1912.

Wellington electrification 
Several Wellington lines were then electrified: in 1938, the Johnsonville Line; and from 1940, the Kapiti Line section of the NIMT north of Wellington to Paekakariki through the two Tawa Tunnels which were part of the Tawa Flat Deviation. This line also had steep gradients (1 in 57) on the bank from Paremata up to Pukerua Bay. 

In February 1946, it was decided to electrify the remaining Wellington suburban lines to the Hutt Valley as there was a shortage of coal for locomotives, and also to replace commuter steam trains with EMUs, as the Hutt Valley was now largely residential with new state housing replacing market gardens. When the extra EMUs arrived in 1949, they were initially used for the Kapiti Line to Paekakariki while the Hutt Valley lines to Upper Hutt and Melling were electrified. So in the Hutt Valley, EMUs were supplemented in peak periods by older carriages hauled by electric locomotives until they were replaced by the Ganz-Mavag EMUs from 1986. 

The Johnsonville and Melling lines were short branch lines which were originally part of the main line (NIMT) north and the Hutt Valley line to the Wairarapa, until the lines replaced by deviations. The sections of these lines that were retained were mainly used for suburban commuter services, with initially some stock traffic to Johnsonville (later to Raroa).

Dieselisation 
For two new long tunnels, diesel operation was more economic than a short electrified section; the Rimutaka Tunnel (1955) and the Kaimai Tunnel (1978). The Rimutaka Tunnel required an intermediate ventilation shaft. From 1967, diesel locomotives (DA class) replaced electric locomotives (EW class) on freight trains south of Paekakariki on the Kapiti Line after the track in some older tunnels was lowered, so diesels could run under the catenary into Wellington.

On two existing electrified tunnels, the electrified section was only a small part of the total line. Hence, the Lyttelton Rail Tunnel was operated by diesel locomotives from 19 September 1970. The Otira Tunnel was long and steep, so for dieselisation from 1997, a door and special ventilation fans were fitted (electrification of the whole 100 km Springfield to Jackson section with its steep gradients had been considered in 1916 and in the 1950s; possibly using 50 Hz AC instead of DC).

Electrification of the NIMT 

The system would have been operated at 16 kV 16.7 Hz AC, and would have been similar to the systems in Austria, Germany, Sweden, Switzerland and Norway; but has been superseded by / for new systems.

The NIMT represented only 12% of the network length, but carried 40% of the system tonnage (13% more than the total South Island tonnage). A hundred Bo-Bo locomotives would be required, and in Auckland, there would be suburban electric services to Henderson west of Auckland and to Papakura 34 km south of Auckland. A report by two Swedish engineers (Thelander and Edenius) was also obtained. Their report said electrification was a matter of necessity and estimated greater capital cost saving with AC electrification instead of DC (1500 V; or 3 kV as proposed by English Electric) than Aickin had allowed for. But the proposal was dropped in favour of dieselisation, with the first mainline DF class diesel locomotives arriving in 1954.

In 1974, a study was undertaken to consider the looming problem of "traffic saturation" on the mountainous central section, particularly the Raurimu Spiral. In 1975, the study recommended electrification using ; but with a decline in traffic the proposal was dropped. In the late 1970s with the "oil shocks" of 1973 and 1979, the Third National Government embarked on several projects to reduce dependence on imported oil.

Electrification of the 412-km centre section of the NIMT was one of the Think Big projects. The project was approved in December 1981; specifications were prepared in 1982 and tenders let in 1982–83. Other works improved the line by easing curves and gradients and replacing signalling. Work started in late 1984 and was completed in 1988 though on the 24 June rather than March as planned, with an official train traversing the whole section. Brush Traction supplied 22 EF class locomotives; the design was scaled up to the Eurotunnel Class 9 locomotives supplied by Brush for the Channel Tunnel.

In December 2016, KiwiRail announced that it proposed to dieselise this section of the NIMT due to the age of the present electric locomotives and the cost and time delays in changing locomotives at each end of the electrified section at Te Rapa and Palmerston North. The decision was reversed in 2018.

Electrification of the Auckland suburban network

The extensive suburban rail network around Auckland which had been operated by steam locomotives and then by diesel locomotives and railcars was electrified using  between April 2014 and July 2015. In 2020, the government announced funding to extend electrification from Papakura to Pukekohe. In 2021, New Zealand rail operator KiwiRail secured independent panel approval of the resource consents for the main works related to its electrification project in South Auckland. The sanction for the electrification of the rail line between Papakura and Pukekohe has been given as per the COVID-19 fast-track legislation.

Existing systems

Auckland metro
All electrified lines in the Auckland metro area uses the 25 kV 50 Hz AC system.

The system is fed from Transpower's 220 kV grid at two locations: Penrose and Southdown

North Island Main Trunk
The North Island Main Trunk uses 25 kV 50 Hz AC. The system used is a 25-0-25 kV auto-transformer system, with autotransformers spaced along the line interconnecting the "positive" 25 kV contact line, earth, and the "negative" 25 kV feeder line.

The system is fed at four traction substations, taking power from Transpower's 220 kV national grid.

Wellington metro
All electrified lines in the Wellington metro area use the 1500 V DC system.
Johnsonville Line: completed 2 June 1938.
Kapiti Line: Wellington Station to Paekakariki completed 1940; extended to Paraparaumu March 1983; extended to Waikanae 20 February 2011.
Hutt Valley Line: Wellington Distant Junction to Taita completed 14 September 1953; extended to Upper Hutt 24 July 1955
Melling Line: Hutt Valley Junction to Lower Hutt (Western Hutt) completed 23 September 1953; extended to Melling 1 March 1954.

The Wellington metro system is fed by 18 traction substations, taking power from Wellington Electricity's (Wellington metro) or Electra's (Kapiti Coast) 11 kV distribution networks. There are also a number of cross-tie substations, which do not feed electricity into the lines but perform switching functions.

Future 
In 2008, a paper was produced by former New Zealand Rail senior managers Murray King and Francis Small, on the extension of the NIMT 25 kV electrification from Te Rapa to Papakura and Hamilton to Tauranga. The report put the total cost of electrification at $860 million, with $433 million for the Papakura-Te Rapa section. It concluded that money would be better spent on grade and curvature easements, removing speed restrictions and increasing the length of passing loops.

In 2012, Auckland Council commissioned a report into electrifying the railway from Papakura to Pukekohe. The project would be undertaken from 2021 to 2040. The Labour Party and National Party both expressed support for the project during the 2017 general election. The April 2018 Auckland Transport Alignment Project report recommended this project as a priority for the coming decade.

References

Citation

Bibliography

 
 
 

 
New Zealand
Electr